William Patrick Palmer (1803–1885), who called himself Sir William Palmer, 9th Baronet, from 1865 (although his claim to the title was never acknowledged), was an Anglican theologian and liturgical scholar of the 19th century.

Life
Born 14 February 1803, Palmer graduated from Worcester College, Oxford. He was an early supporter and influence in the Oxford Movement, but was superseded by John Henry Newman and Edward Pusey. Palmer initially supported the Tracts for the Times, but as opposition to the Oxford Movement grew, he withdrew his support, prompting a cooling in his friendship with Newman and a slow decline in his involvement with the movement. Palmer died in October 1885 in London.

Works
Palmer was author of the Origines Liturgicæ and Treatise on the Church of Christ (1838). The latter formulated the notion, called the "Branch Theory" that, provided that both the apostolic succession, and the Faith of the Apostles are kept intact, then there the Church exists, albeit in one of its branches. This was applied to the Anglican Church.

References

Footnotes

Bibliography

External links

1803 births
1885 deaths
Anglican liturgists
19th-century English theologians
English Anglican theologians
19th-century English Anglican priests
Alumni of Worcester College, Oxford
Anglo-Catholic theologians
English Anglo-Catholics
Anglo-Catholic clergy